The Moralia ( Ethika; loosely translated as "Morals" or "Matters relating to customs and mores") is a group of manuscripts dating from the 10th–13th centuries, traditionally ascribed to the 1st-century Greek scholar Plutarch of Chaeronea. The eclectic collection contains 78 essays and transcribed speeches. They provide insights into Roman and Greek life, but often are also timeless observations in their own right. Many generations of Europeans have read or imitated them, including Michel de Montaigne and the Renaissance Humanists and Enlightenment philosophers.

Contents

General structure
The Moralia include On the Fortune or the Virtue of Alexander the Great, an important adjunct to his Life of the great general; On the Worship of Isis and Osiris, a crucial source of information on Egyptian religious rites; and On the Malice of Herodotus (which may, like the orations on Alexander's accomplishments, have been a rhetorical exercise), in which Plutarch criticizes what he sees as systematic bias in the Histories of Herodotus; along with more philosophical treatises, such as On the Decline of the Oracles, On the Delays of the Divine Vengeance, On Peace of Mind and lighter fare, such as Odysseus and Gryllus ("Bruta animalia ratione uti"), a humorous dialog between Homer's Odysseus and one of Circe's enchanted pigs. The Moralia were composed first, while writing the Lives occupied much of the last two decades of Plutarch's own life.

Some editions of the Moralia include several works now known to be pseudepigrapha. Among these are the Lives of the Ten Orators (biographies of the Attic orators based on Caecilius of Calacte), On the Opinions of the Philosophers, On Fate, and On Music. One "Pseudo-Plutarch" is held responsible for all of these works, though their authorship is unknown. Though the thoughts and opinions recorded are not Plutarch's and come from a slightly later era, they are all classical in origin and have value to the historian.

Books
Since the Stephanus edition of 1572, the Moralia have traditionally been arranged in 14 books, as in the following list that includes the English, the original Greek, and the Latin title:

I. (1a – 86a)
1. On the Education of Children ( – De liberis educandis)
2. How the Young Man Should Study Poetry (Πῶς δεῖ τὸν νέον ποιημάτων ἀκούειν – Quomodo adolescens poetas audire debeat)
3. On Hearing (Περὶ τοῦ ἀκούειν – De recta ratione audiendi)
4. How to Tell a Flatterer from a Friend (Πῶς ἄν τις διακρίνοιε τὸν κόλακα τοῦ φίλου – Quomodo adulator ab amico internoscatur)
5. How a Man May Become Aware of his Progress in Virtue (Πῶς ἄν τις αἴσθοιτο ἑαυτοῦ προκόπτοντος ἐπ᾿ ἀρετῇ - Quomodo quis suos in virtute sentiat profectus)
II. (86b – 171e)
6. How to Profit by One's Enemies (Πῶς ἄν τις ὑπ᾿ ἐχθρῶν ὠφελοῖτο – De capienda ex inimicis utilitate)
7. On Having Many Friends (Περὶ πολυφιλίας – De amicorum multitudine)
8. On Chance (Περὶ τύχης - De fortuna)
9. On Virtue and Vice (Περὶ ἀρετῆς καὶ κακίας – De virtute et vitio)
10. Letter of Condolence to Apollonius (Παραμυθητικὸς πρὸς Ἀπολλώνιον – Consolatio ad Apollonium)
11. Advice about Keeping Well (Ὑγιεινὰ παραγγέλματα – De tuenda sanitate praecepta)
12. Advice to Bride and Groom (Γαμικὰ παραγγέλματα – Coniugalia praecepta)
13. Dinner of the Seven Wise Men (Ἑπτά σοφῶν συμπόσιον – Septem sapientium convivium)
14. On Superstition (Περὶ δεισιδαιμονίας – De superstitione)
III. (172a – 263c)
15. Sayings of Kings and Commanders (Βασιλέων ἀποφθέγματα καὶ στρατηγών – regum et imperatorum apophthegmata)
16. Sayings of the Spartans (Ἀποφθέγματα Λακωνικά – apophthegmata Laconica)
17. Institutions of the Spartans (Τὰ παλαιὰ τῶν Λακεδαιμονίων ἐπιτηδεύματα – Instituta Laconica)
18. Sayings of the Spartan Women (Λακαινῶν ἀποφθέγματα – Lacaenarum apophthegmata)
19. Virtues of Women (Γυναικῶν ἀρεταί – Mulierum virtutes)
IV. (263d – 351b)
20. Roman Questions (Αἴτια Ῥωμαϊκά – Quaestiones Romanae) 	
21. Greek Questions (Αἴτια Ἑλληνικά – Quaestiones Graecae)
22. Greek and Roman Parallel Stories (Συναγωγὴ ἱστοριῶν παραλλήλων Ἑλληνικῶν καὶ Ρωμαϊκῶν – Parallela minora) (pseudo-Plutarch)
23. On the Fortune of the Romans (Περὶ τῆς Ῥωμαίων τύχης – De fortuna Romanorum)	
24. On the Fortune or Virtue of Alexander the Great (Περὶ τῆς Ἀλεξάνδρου τύχης ἢ ἀρετῆς – De Alexandri magni fortuna aut virtute)	
25. On the Glory of the Athenians (Πότερον Ἀθηναῖοι κατὰ πόλεμον ἢ κατὰ σοφίαν ἐνδοξότεροι – De gloria Atheniensium)
V. (351c – 438e)
26. On Isis and Osiris (Περὶ Ἴσιδος καὶ Ὀσίριδος – De Iside et Osiride) 	
27. On the epsilon at Delphi (Περὶ τοῦ εἶ τοῦ έν Δελφοῖς – De E apud Delphos, 384e – 394c)
28. Oracles at Delphi no Longer Given in Verse (Περὶ τοῦ μὴ χρᾶν ἔμμετρα νῦν τὴν Πυθίαν – De Pythiae oraculis) 	
29. On the Obsolescence of Oracles (Περὶ τῶν ἐκλελοιπότων χρηστηρίων – De defectu oraculorum)
VI. (439a - 523b)
30. Can Virtue be Taught? (Εἰ διδακτὸν ἡ ἀρετή – An virtus doceri possit)
31. On Moral Virtue (Περὶ ἠθικῆς ἀρετῆς – De virtute morali)
32. On the Control of Anger (Περὶ ἀοργησίας – De cohibenda ira)
33. On Tranquility of Mind (Περὶ εὐθυμίας – De tranquillitate animi)
34. On Brotherly Love (Περὶ φιλαδελφίας – De fraterno amore)
35. On Affection for Offspring (Περὶ τῆς εἰς τὰ ἔγγονα φιλοστοργίας – De amore prolis)
36. Whether Vice is Sufficient to Cause Unhappiness (Εἰ αὐτάρκης ἡ κακία πρὸς κακοδαιμονίαν – An vitiositas ad infelicitatem sufficiat)
37. Whether Aflictions of the Soul are Worse than Those of the Body (Περὶ τοῦ πότερον τὰ ψυχῆς ἢ τὰ σώματος πάθη χείρονα – Animine an corporis affectiones sint peiores)
38. On Talkativeness (Περὶ ἀδολεσχίας – De garrulitate)
39. On Being a Busybody (Περὶ πολυπραγμοσύνης – De curiositate)
VII. (523c – 612b)
40. On Love of Wealth (Περὶ φιλοπλουτίας – De cupiditate divitiarum)
41. On Compliancy (Περὶ δυσωπίας – De vitioso pudore)
42. On Envy and Hate (Περὶ φθόνου καὶ μίσους – De invidia et odio)
43. On Praising Oneself Inoffensively (Περὶ τοῦ ἑαυτὸν ἐπαινεῖν ἀνεπιφθόνως – De laude ipsius)
44. On the Delays of Divine Vengeance (Περὶ τῶν ὑπὸ τοῦ θείου βραδέως τιμωρουμένων – De sera numinis vindicta)
45. On Fate (Περὶ εἰμαρμένης – De fato) (pseudo-Plutarch)
46. On the Sign of Socrates (Περὶ τοῦ Σωκράτους δαιμονίου – De genio Socratis, 575a – 598e)
47. On Exile (Περὶ φυγῆς – De exilio)
48. Consolation to his Wife (Παραμυθητικὸς πρὸς τὴν γυναῖκα – Consolatio ad uxorem)
VIII. (612c – 748)
49. Table Talk (Συμποσιακά – Quaestiones convivales)
IX. (748 – 771)
50. Dialogue on Love (Ἐρωτικός - Amatorius)
X. (771e – 854d)
51. Love Stories (Ἐρωτικαὶ διηγήσεις – Amatoriae narrationes)
52. A Philosopher Ought to Converse Especially with Men in Power (Περὶ τοῦ ὅτι μάλιστα τοῖς ἡγεμόσι δεῖ τὸν φιλόσοφον διαλέγεσθαι – Maxime cum principibus philosopho esse disserendum)
53. To an Uneducated Ruler (Πρὸς ἡγεμόνα ἀπαίδευτον – Ad principem ineruditum)
54. Whether an Old Man Should Engage in Public Affairs (Εἰ πρεσβυτέρῳι πολιτευτέον – An seni respublica gerenda sit)
55. Precepts of Statecraft (Πολιτικὰ παραγγέλματα – Praecepta gerendae reipublicae)
56. On Monarchy, Democracy and Oligarchy (Περὶ μοναρχίας καὶ δημοκρατίας καὶ ὀλιγαρχίας – De unius in republica dominatione, populari statu, et paucorum imperio)
57. That we Ought Not to Borrow (Περὶ τοῦ μὴ δεῖν δανείζεσθαι – De vitando aere alieno)
58. Lives of the Ten Orators (Βίοι τῶν δέκα ῥητόρων – Vitae decem oratorum) (pseudo-Plutarch)
59. Comparison between Aristophanes and Menander (Συγκρίσεως Ἀριστοφάνους καὶ Μενάνδρου ἐπιτομή – Comparationis Aristophanis et Menandri compendium)
XI. (854e – 919e)
60. On the Malice of Herodotus (Περὶ τῆς Ἡροδότου κακοηθείας – De malignitate Herodoti)
61. On the Opinions of the Philosophers (Περὶ τῶν ἀρεσκόντων φιλοσόφοις φυσικῶν δογμάτων – De placitis philosophorum) (pseudo-Plutarch)
62. Causes of Natural Phenomena (Αἴτια φυσικά – Quaestiones naturales)
XII. (920a – 999b)
63. On the Face Which Appears in the Orb of the Moon ( – De facie in orbe lunae)
64. On the Principle of Cold (Περὶ τοῦ πρώτως ψυχροῦ – De primo frigido)
65. Whether Fire or Water is More Useful (Περὶ τοῦ πότερον ὕδωρ ὴ πῦρ χρησιμώτερον – Aquane an ignis sit utilior)
66. Whether Land or Sea Animals are Cleverer (Πότερα τῶν ζῴων φρονιμώτερα τὰ χερσαία ἢ τὰ ἔνυδρα – De sollertia animalium)
67. Beasts are Rational (Περὶ τοῦ τὰ ἄλογα λόγῳ χρῆσθαι – Bruta animalia ratione uti)
68. On the Eating of Flesh (Περὶ σαρκοφαγίας – De esu carnium)
XIII. (999c - 1086b)
69. Platonic Questions (Πλατωνικὰ ζητήματα – Platonicae quaestiones)
70. On the Birth of the Spirit in Timaeus (Περὶ τῆς ἐν Τιμαίῳ ψυχογονίας – De animae procreatione in Timaeo)
71. Summary of the Birth of the Spirit (Ἐπιτομή τοῦ Περὶ τῆς ἐν τῷ Τιμαίῳ ψυχογονίας – Epitome libri de animae procreatione in Timaeo)
72. On Stoic Self-Contradictions (Περὶ Στωϊκῶν ἐναντιωμάτων – De Stoicorum repugnantiis)
73. The Stoics Speak More Paradoxically than the Poets (Ὅτι παραδοξότερα οἱ Στωϊκοὶ τῶν ποιητῶν λέγουσιν – Stoicos absurdiora poetis dicere)
74. On Common Conceptions against the Stoics (Περὶ τῶν κοινῶν ἐννοιῶν πρὸς τοὺς Στωϊκούς – De communibus notitiis adversus Stoicos)
XIV. (1086c onward)
75. It is Impossible to Live Pleasantly in the Manner of Epicurus (Ὅτι οὐδὲ ἡδέως ζῆν ἔστιν κατ’ Ἐπίκουρον – Non posse suaviter vivi secundum Epicurum)
76. Against Colotes (Πρὸς Κωλώτην – Adversus Colotem)
77. Is the Saying "Live in Obscurity" Right? (Εἰ καλῶς εἴρηται τὸ λάθε βιώσας – An recte dictum sit latenter esse vivendum)
78. On Music (Περὶ μουσικῆς – De musica) (pseudo-Plutarch)

Editions

Early manuscripts
"The catalogue is transmitted by a group of Moralia manuscripts, the oldest of which is the Parisinus gr. 1678 (very damaged in the folia containing the list), a copy from the tenth century, on which a second hand of the twelfth century intervened to add the list; see Irigoin (1987: CCCIII–CCGXVIII for introduction and critical edition of the entire catalogue)." (Oikonomopoulou 174)
The only surviving manuscript containing all seventy-eight of the extant treatises included in Plutarch's Moralia dates to sometime shortly after 1302 AD.

Modern editions
 Plutarch. Moralia. 16 vols. (vol. 13: 13.1 & 13.2, vol. 16: index), transl. by Frank Cole Babbitt (vol. 1–5) et al., series: "Loeb Classical Library" (LCL, vols. 197–499). Cambridge, Massachusetts: Harvard University Press et al., 1927–2004.

Specific ideas contained

Origins dilemma
In his essay "The Symposiacs", Plutarch discusses the famous problem of the chicken and the egg. Although Plutarch was not the first person to discuss the problem (Aristotle had already discussed it hundreds of years before Plutarch), he was the first person to put the question into its modern form.

On reincarnation
Included in Moralia is a letter addressed by Plutarch to his wife, bidding her not give way to excessive grief at the death of their two-year-old daughter, who was named Timoxena after her mother. In the letter, Plutarch expresses his belief in reincarnation:

On the intellect

Mind or Nous is a philosophical term for intellect. In Moralia, Plutarch agrees with Plato that the soul is more divine than the body while nous is more divine than the soul. The mix of soul and body produces pleasure and pain; the conjunction of mind and soul produces reason which is the cause or the source of virtue and vice.

Early humanist editions 
Erasmus of Rotterdam is credited with a prominent role in the dissemination of the Moralia since the early 1500s. He has accessed the Moralia the first time while being an assistant to Demetrius Ducas in Venice. He and Girolamo Aleandro served as the proofreaders of a Greek edition of the Moralia which was published by the Italian printer Aldus Manutius in March 1509. When Erasmus the left Venice for England, he took one book with him.  He then began to translate it into latin in Cambridge 1511. Erasmus published several chapters of the Moralia in England, until the complete Moralia with eight chapters was published in August 1514 in Basel by Johann Froben. By Jorge Leto it is suggested that six chapters were published earlier in late 1513 or early 1514 by Badius Ascensius. The translation of Erasmus saw five editions printed by Froben between 1514 and 1520.

References

Further reading
 Aalders, Gerhard J. D. 1982. Plutarch’s Political Thought. Amsterdam: North Holland.
 Chapman, Ann. 2011. The Female Principle in Plutarch’s Moralia. Dublin, Ireland: Univ. of Dublin Press.
 Jones, Christopher P. 1966. "Towards a Chronology of Plutarch’s Works." Journal of Roman Studies 56:61–74.
 Opsomer, Jan. 2007. "The Place of Plutarch in the History of Platonism." In Plutarco e la Cultura della sua Età. Edited by Paola Volpe Cacciatore and Franco Ferrari, 283–309. Naples, Italy: D’Auria.
 Russell, Donald A. 1973. Plutarch. London: Duckworth.
 Titchener, Frances B. 1995. "Plutarch's Use of Thucydides in the Moralia." Phoenix 49.3: 189–200.
 Van der Stockt, Luc. 1999. "A Plutarchan Hypomnema on Self-Love." American Journal of Philology 120:575–599.
 Van der Stockt, Luc. 2000. Rhetorical Theory and Praxis in Plutarch. Leuven, Belgium: Peeters.
Van Hoof, Lieve. 2010. Plutarch’s Practical Ethics: The Social Dynamics of Philosophy. Oxford: Oxford Univ. Press.
 Van Nuffelen, Peter. 2011. Rethinking the Gods: Philosophical Readings of Religion in the Post-Hellenistic Period. Cambridge, UK, and New York: Cambridge Univ. Pres

External links

Plutarch's Moralia in ToposText Complete Goodwin translation of 1878 as HTML files tagged with geolocated place names.
Plutarch page at LacusCurtius (20th-century English translation includes On the Fortune or Virtue of Alexander, On the Fortune of the Romans, Roman Questions, Isis and Osiris, "On Putting One's Enemies to Use", and the so‑called Parallela Minora, which is probably one of those pseudepigrapha.)
List of translations from Attalus.org Selected translations.
Sentiments concerning nature from ebooks@adelaide.edu.au
Plutarch's Morals and Plutarch's Essays Volume 3 from Project Gutenberg
Volume I and Volume II of 1841 Greek/Latin edition of the entire Moralia through Google Books.
 

Works by Plutarch
2nd-century books
Ethics literature
Ethnology
Ancient Roman philosophical literature